Favartia conleyi is a species of sea snail, a marine gastropod mollusk in the family Muricidae, the murex snails or rock snails.

Description

Distribution
This species occurs in the Pacific Ocean off Guam.

References

 Houart, R., 1999. - Description of a new species of Favartia from Guam, Mariana Archipelago (Gastropoda: Muricidae). Venus 58(1): 13-17

External links
 MNHN, Paris: holotype

Muricidae
Gastropods described in 1999